Siennica Różana  is a village in Krasnystaw County, Lublin Voivodeship, in eastern Poland. It is the seat of the gmina (administrative district) called Gmina Siennica Różana.

The village has an approximate population of 1,000.

References

Villages in Krasnystaw County